The Banks–Vernonia State Trail is a paved rail trail and state park in northwest Oregon in the United States.

A second railroad trestle, the Tophill (or Horseshoe) Trestle, was damaged by fire in 1986 and is bypassed with a series of switchbacks at the Tophill trailhead.

Amenities available at some locations in the park include picnicking, fishing, wildlife watching, forests, bird-watching, historic sites, public restrooms, parking, horse hitching posts, a loading platform, and a whistle stop shelter. About 14,000 people used the rail trail in 2004.

History 
The Banks–Vernonia State Trail was the first linear rail trail state park in Oregon. The Portland, Astoria, and Pacific Railroad built the original rail line in 1913 to transport timber, freight, and passengers. In the 1920s, trains on the line hauled logs and lumber from Keasey and the Oregon-American mill in Vernonia to Portland. The railroad stopped using the line in 1957 after the mills closed, and from 1965 through 1969 the Vernonia South Park and Sunset Railroad leased the line for a steam excursion train.

The line was abandoned in 1973. The Oregon Department of Transportation bought the right-of-way in 1974, and transferred it to the Oregon Parks and Recreation Department in 1990. In 2007 L. L. "Stub" Stewart State Park opened adjacent to the trail. Trail improvements, which continued for two decades, were completed in 2010 with the opening of the Banks trailhead and its kiosk, which resembles a railroad depot.

The beginning of the trail runs through Pihl Road, in Manning, Oregon, named after Holger Mathew Pihl Sr. Hollie Pihl, a Circuit Court Judge, and his wife Alice spent countless hours clearing brush from the abandoned rail lines and donated money to help complete the project when project funds ran out. The two also funded the Buxton Trailhead picnic pavilion and owned naming rights, choosing to call it the "Whistle Stop".

Locations

References

External links

 
 

Rail trails in Oregon
Transportation in Columbia County, Oregon
Transportation in Washington County, Oregon
Parks in Columbia County, Oregon
Parks in Washington County, Oregon
1990 establishments in Oregon
Banks, Oregon